The Siah Bisheh Pumped Storage Power Plant, also spelled Siyāhbisheh and Siah Bishe, is located in the Alborz Mountain range near the village of Siah Bisheh and  south of Chalus in Mazandaran Province, Iran. The power plant uses the pumped-storage hydroelectric method to generate electricity during periods of high energy demand, making it a peaking power plant, intended to fulfill peak electricity demand in Tehran  to the south. Planning for the project began in the 1970s and construction began in 1985. It was delayed from 1992 until 2001 and the first generator went online in May 2013. The remaining generators were commissioned by 1 September 2015. The power plant is the first pumped-storage type in Iran and will also use the country's first concrete-face rock-fill dam – two of them.

Background
A site was first identified for the power plant in the 1970s when a study was carried out on the water resources of the Albors Mountains by the Belgian firm Traksionel. Several sites for dams were identified including Siah Bisheh as a potential place for a pumped-storage power plant. In 1975, a feasibility report on the Siah Bisheh project was submitted to the Ministry of Energy. The Albors Mountains study concluded in 1977 and geologic studies began in 1978 but were halted in 1979 due to the Iranian Revolution. In 1983, Lahmeyer International was contracted to create designs for Phase II (underground excavation) which were completed in 1985, the same year construction on the dam's diversion tunnels began. Further designs for Phase I (superstructures) were developed and construction continued until 1992 when a lack of funding halted the project once again. Construction would not commence again until 2001. In 2002 and 2003, contracts for the dams and power plant were awarded and construction continued. The project was 90 percent complete as of April 2012. Both the upper and lower reservoir were complete and had finished impounding in January 2013. The first of four generators was commissioned in May 2013 and the remaining were operational by 1 September 2015.

Design and operation
The power plant operates using a lower and upper reservoir along with a power plant connected to both. Water is either pumped from the lower to the upper reservoir to serve as stored energy or released from the upper to the lower reservoir to generate electricity. Pumping occurs during low demand, cheap electricity, periods such as night and generating will occur during peak demand, expensive electricity, hours such as during the day. The pumping/generating process repeats as needed.

Each of the dams are equipped with a chute staircase spillway.

Connecting the upper reservoir to the power station is an intake which feeds water into two  diameter head-race tunnels. At the power station, each penstock bifurcates into two penstocks to supply the four Francis turbine pump-generators with water. The pump-generators have a generating capacity of 260 MW and pumping capacity of 235 MW. When pumping is required, the pump-generators reverse into pumps and send water back to the upper reservoir through the same water conduits.

AF-Consult Switzerland Ltd acted as Owner's Engineer (Lead Consultant) during the design and supervision. Tractebel Engineering GmbH (Lahmeyer International) acted as Detailed Engineering Designer (EPC Engineer) for tunnels, shafts, manifolds, caverns and electro-mechanical equipment.

See also

List of pumped-storage hydroelectric power stations
List of power stations in Iran

External links
Siahbishe Project at Iran Water & Power Resources Development Co.

References

Dams completed in 2013
Energy infrastructure completed in 2015
Pumped-storage hydroelectric power stations in Iran
Concrete-face rock-fill dams
Dams in Mazandaran Province
2013 establishments in Iran
Buildings and structures in Mazandaran Province
Caspian Sea basin